Malnad PU College is a pre-university college in Shimoga. It is affiliated to Karnataka Pre-University Education Board. It is located in NH-206 Sagar Road

References

Universities and colleges in Shimoga district